Lufa District is a district of the Eastern Highlands Province in Papua New Guinea. Its capital is Lufa.

Lufa experienced first European contact in the late 1930s.

Districts of Eastern Highlands Province